John Stanley Rice (January 28, 1899 – August 2, 1985) was an American Democratic politician, farmer and businessman from the Commonwealth of Pennsylvania. Rice served in a variety of appointed and elected political roles over the course of a three-decade political career.

Background
A native of Brysonia, a small town several miles north of Gettysburg, Rice graduated from Gettysburg College. He became a successful apple grower, and went on to manufacture packaged apple products. He often returned to this business between political appointments. Rice was a Lutheran.

Political career
Rice was elected to the Pennsylvania State Senate in 1932. He was elected Democratic floor leader in 1937, following the resignation of Warren Roberts, who took office as State Auditor General. He was elected the Senate's President pro tempore in 1939.

In 1946, he was the Democratic nominee for governor, but lost to Republican State Attorney General James Duff.

Gubernatorial appointments

In 1955, Governor George Leader named Rice to the first round of appointments to the overhauled Pennsylvania Liquor Control Board. He resigned from the board later that year, when Leader appointed him Secretary of the Department of Property and Supplies (now the Department of General Services).

After resigning from the cabinet in 1957, he returned to his apple farm and packaging business. However, in 1958, Leader again appointed Rice to a position in his cabinet, having him succeed the deceased James Finnegan as Secretary of the Commonwealth. Rice was also elected chair of the State Democratic Party in 1959.

In 1961, Rice received his final political appointment, when President Kennedy named him U.S. Ambassador to the Netherlands. He stepped-down from the position three years later.

Death and legacy
Rice died in Fort Lauderdale in August 1985.

Rice Hall, on the campus of Gettysburg College, is named in his honor.  He had served as a trustee of the college from 1939 until 1972, when he retired to Fort Lauderdale.

References

1899 births
1985 deaths
American Lutherans
Gettysburg College alumni
Ambassadors of the United States to the Netherlands
Pennsylvania state senators
Presidents pro tempore of the Pennsylvania Senate
Secretaries of the Commonwealth of Pennsylvania
Pennsylvania Democratic Party chairs
20th-century American politicians
20th-century Lutherans